Luigi Grassi (born 21 October 1983) is an Italian footballer. He plays as a striker.

External links
 Luigi Grassi's profile on San Marino Calcio's official website

1983 births
Living people
Italian footballers
A.S.D. Victor San Marino players
U.S. Città di Pontedera players
U.S. Salernitana 1919 players
Ascoli Calcio 1898 F.C. players
Serie B players
Association football forwards